The Oberweißbacher Bergbahn is a German railway in the Thuringian Highland, Thuringia. Since 1922 it connects Obstfelderschmiede (Mellenbach-Glasbach) with the village Cursdorf. The train consists of 1.351 km broad gauge cable railway and a connects to 2.635 km standard gauge electrified adhesion railway.

History
Both railways are operationally closely linked. Since January 1982 the Oberweissbacher-Bergbahn is a historical monument. The railway is operated by Deutsche Bahn AG and offers about thirty rides every half-hour from 5:30 am to 8:00 pm.

Operation

This funicular is unusual because instead of using two purpose-built passenger vehicles, it only features one. The other vehicle is a flatbed truck that is designed to carry a single standard gauge passenger car, freight wagon or locomotive between the conventional railway systems at the bottom and the top. At the top, both vehicles pull into a passenger halt at Lichtenhain/Bergbahn, but the standard gauge rails on the flatbed car can interface with the standard gauge railway.

At the bottom, there is a turnout that sends the two vehicles into separate termini. The passenger vehicle is directed into a conventional funicular passenger halt, but the flatbed vehicle is directed to interface with a turntable on the Schwartzatalbahn adjacent to Obstfelderschmiede station. In normal day-to-day passenger service, the flatbed vehicle is loaded with a dedicated passenger car carrying the Oberweißbacher Bergbahn branding. Passenger access to this car is provided at the terminus.

References

External links

 Oberweißbacher Bergbahn official website
 Oberweißbacher Bergbahn on the DB-Schwarzatalbahn website
 Lichtenhainer Waldeisenbahn

Funicular railways in Germany
Railway lines in Thuringia